Álvaro Pineda (November 9, 1945 – January 18, 1975) was a Mexican jockey who competed in thoroughbred horse racing in the United States.
A top jockey in California, in 1966 Álvaro Pineda finished second in wins at Del Mar Racetrack to Donald Pierce and was the track's leading rider in 1968. He made one appearance in the Kentucky Derby, finishing 13th in 1967.

In 1974, Álvaro Pineda's peers voted him the George Woolf Memorial Jockey Award, awarded annually to a jockey in American racing who demonstrates high standards of personal and professional conduct, on and off the racetrack.

In early 1975, while competing at Santa Anita Park in Arcadia, California, Álvaro Pineda was killed from a blow to his head when his horse, Austin Mittler,  reared in the starting gate and flipped over, crushing his head against the steel frame of the gate. In 1978 his younger brother Roberto, a jockey competing at Pimlico Race Course in Baltimore, Maryland, also died from an accident during a race.

References

 Álvaro Pineda accident at The Jockeys Guild
 

1945 births
1975 deaths
American jockeys
Mexican emigrants to the United States
Mexican jockeys
Jockeys who died while racing
Sports deaths in California
Mexican sportsmen